Annelie is a given name. Notable people with the name include:

Annelie Ehrhardt, (born 1950), German athlete who competed in hurdling
Annelie Enochson (born 1953), Swedish Christian Democratic politician and architect
Annelie Lotriet (born 1960), South African politician, currently MP with the Democratic Alliance and Shadow Minister of Arts and Culture
Annelie Minny (born 1986), international cricketer for South Africa national women's cricket team
Annelie Pompe (born 1980), adventurer and athlete from Mölndal, Sweden

See also
Anneli